The following lists of presidents are available:

Current presidents
List of current presidents

Supra-national organisations
Central American Parliament
Council of Europe
Economic Community of West African States Commission
European Union institutions
European Central Bank
European Commission
European Court of Justice
European Investment Bank
International Olympic Committee
Pan-African Parliament
Union of South American Nations
United Nations General Assembly
United Nations Security Council

UN member countries

Former states

Biafra
Confederate States of America
Czechoslovakia
Ichkeria, Chechen Republic of
Orange Free State
Republic of the Rio Grande
Rhodesia
Spain, Second Republic of (Republican Spain)
South Yemen
Soviet Union
Tanganyika
Texas, Republic of
Yucatán, Republic of
Yugoslavia
Zimbabwe Rhodesia

Other states

Abkhazia
Ambazonia
Artsakh
Bougainville
British Virgin Islands
China, Republic of (Taiwan)
Donetsk, People's Republic of
Guadeloupe
Kosovo
Kurdistan
Luhansk, People's Republic of
Northern Cyprus
Sahrawi Arab Democratic Republic
Somaliland
South Ossetia
Palestine, State of
Transnistria

Other organisations

American Statistical Association
British Computer Society
College of William & Mary
FIFA
Geological Society of London
Institute of Structural Engineers
Institution of Civil Engineers
Institution of Electrical Engineers
Institution of Mathematical Statistics
National Organization for Women
Royal College of Physicians
Royal College of Physicians of Edinburgh
Royal College of Surgeons of Edinburgh
Royal Society of Medicine
Royal Society
Royal Statistical Society
University of Central Florida
University of South Carolina

See also
Fictional presidents
Lists of fictional presidents of the United States